Mutanen is a Finnish surname. Notable people with the surname include:

  (1914–2003), Finnish opera singer
 Annikka Mutanen (born 1965), Finnish judoka
 Sami Mutanen (born 1984), Finnish ice hockey player

Finnish-language surnames